Susan Hahn is a bestselling Illinois poet, playwright and novelist. She is also a Guggenheim fellow.

Biography 
She was born Susan Firestone in Chicago, Illinois on November 11, 1951, and attended Highland Park High School. She attended Northwestern University where she received a B.A. and an M.A. in psychology She began working at the Woodlawn Mental Health Center after graduation and became licensed as a group therapist. After incorporating writing and art into her therapy, she began to write her own work and submitted some of her poems to Poetry magazine, where they were accepted.

In 1997 she started editing TriQuarterly literary magazine. She remained with TriQuarterly until 2010, when the magazine went to an online-only format. She is also a co-editor of works published by Northwestern University.

Hahn was the Ernest Hemingway Foundation's first writer-in-residence in 2013.

Work
Hahn's writing has been described by Donna Seaman as displaying "bewitching" language and "sly" humor. As the featured Illinois poet, her work was described by the State of Illinois as "voyages into the uncharted seas of self and other."

Her novel, The Six Granddaughters of Cecil Slaughter, was favorably reviewed by Booklist and Library Journal.

In 1994, Hahn received a Society of Midland Authors Award for Poetry.

The Chicago Tribune listed Holiday and Mother in Summer in the ranks of the Best Books of 2002.

Novel
Losing Beck: A Triptych (2018)
The Six Granddaughters of Cecil Slaughter (2012)

Poetry
The Note She Left (2008)
The Scarlet Ibis (2007)
Self/Pity (2005)Mother in Summer (2002)Holiday (2001)Confession (1997)Melancholia, Etcetera (1995)Incontinence (1993)Harriet Rubin's Mother's Wooden Hand (1991)

PlaysThe Scarlet Ibis (2007, reprised 2008)Golf'' (2005)

Awards and honors
Susan Hahn's honors and awards include:
Hemingway Foundation, inaugural Writer-in-Residence (2013-2014)
Pushcart Prizes, in fiction and poetry
First Class of Distinguished Alumni, Highland Park High School (2005)
Guggenheim Foundation Fellowship in Poetry (2003-2004)
Poetry Magazine's George Kent Prize (2000)
The Society of Midland Authors Award for Poetry (1994)
Illinois Arts Council Literary Awards and Fellowships

References

External links 
 Susan Hahn's Website
 Susan Hahn on IndieBound.org
 Susan Hahn at the Academy of American Poets

Living people
Writers from Chicago
American women poets
Northwestern University alumni
1941 births
American women novelists
American women dramatists and playwrights
20th-century American poets
20th-century American women writers
21st-century American poets
21st-century American novelists
21st-century American dramatists and playwrights
21st-century American women writers
Novelists from Illinois